The 2016–17 Big 12 men's basketball season is the ongoing 21st season of basketball for the Big 12 Conference. Team practices began in October 2016, and were followed by the start of the regular season on November 11. Conference play began on December 30, 2016 and will conclude with the 2017 Big 12 men's basketball tournament, beginning March 8, 2017 at the Sprint Center in Kansas City. During the conference's non-conference schedule, Big 12 teams posted a win percentage of .822, the best non-conference win percentage of any conference in the nation.

Preseason

Big 12 Preseason Poll

Pre-Season All-Big 12 Team

Player of the Year: Monte Morris, Iowa State
Newcomer of the Year: Manu Lecomte, Baylor
Freshman of the Year: Josh Jackson, Kansas

Tournaments

Head coaches

Note: Stats shown are before the beginning of the season. Overall and Big 12 records are from time at current school.

Rankings

Regular season

Conference matrix

Points scored

Schedules

Baylor

|+ style="background:#; color:#;" | Baylor Bears Schedule
|-
!colspan=6 style="background:#; color:#;"|Big 12 Regular season

|-
! colspan=6 style="background:#;"| Big 12 tournament

Iowa State

|+ style="background:#; color:#;" |  Iowa State Cyclones Schedule
|-
!colspan=6 style="background:#; color:#;"|Big 12 Regular season

|-
!colspan=6 style="background:#;"| Big 12 tournament

Kansas

|+ style="background:#; color:#;" |  Kansas Jayhawks Schedule
|-
!colspan=6 style="background:#; color:#;"|Big 12 Regular season

|-
! colspan=6 style="background:#;"| Big 12 tournament

Kansas State

|+ style="background:#; color:#;" |  Kansas State Wildcats Schedule
|-
!colspan=6 style="background:#; color:#;"|Big 12 Regular season

|-
!colspan=12 style="background:#; color:#;"| Big 12 tournament

Oklahoma

|+ style="background:#; color:#;" |  Oklahoma Sooners Schedule
|-
!colspan=6 style="background:#; color:#;"|Big 12 Regular season

|-
! colspan=9 style="background:#; color:#;"| Big 12 tournament

Oklahoma State

|+ style="background:#; color:#;" |  Oklahoma State Cowboys Schedule
|-
!colspan=6 style="background:#; color:#;"|Big 12 Regular season

|-
!colspan=6 style="background:#; color:#;"| Big 12 tournament

TCU

|+ style="background:#; color:#;" |  TCU Horned Frogs Schedule
|-
!colspan=6 style="background:#; color:#;"|Big 12 Regular season

|-
!colspan=6 style="background:#; color:#;"| Big 12 tournament

Texas

|+ style="background:#; color:#;" |  Texas Longhorns Schedule
|-
!colspan=6 style="background:#; color:#;"|Big 12 Regular season

|-
!colspan=6 style="background:#"| Big 12 tournament

Texas Tech

|+ style="background:#; color:#;" |  Texas Tech Red Raiders Schedule
|-
!colspan=6 style="background:#; color:#;"|Big 12 Regular season

|-
!colspan=6 style="background:#; color:;"| Big 12 tournament

West Virginia

|+ style="background:#; color:#;" |  West Virginia Mountaineers Schedule
|-
!colspan=6 style="background:#; color:#;"|Big 12 Regular season

|-
!colspan=9 style="background:#; color:#;"| Big 12 tournament

Honors and awards

All-Americans

All-Big 12 awards and teams

Phillips 66 Player of the Week

Postseason

Big 12 tournament

  March 8–11, 2017–Big 12 Conference Basketball Tournament, Sprint Center, Kansas City, MO.

Bracket

NCAA tournament

NIT

See also
 2016–17 NCAA Division I men's basketball season
 Big 12 Conference
 Big 12/SEC Challenge

References